Events in 2018 pertaining to politics and government in the United States.

Events

October
 11 October — The US Armed Forces ground all F35 fighter planes due to a crash in Beaufort, South Carolina that occurred in late September 2018.

November
 6 November — United States elections, 2018.

References

 
United States